"Battling" Jim Johnson (September 2, 1887 – November 1, 1918) was an American boxer who fought as a heavyweight from 1908 to 1918. He had little success and lost with great frequency to top boxers such as Sam Langford, Joe Jeanette, Sam McVey, Harry Wills and Kid Norfolk.

In spite of this, Jack Johnson, the first black world heavyweight champion, gave him a title shot. When they fought in Paris in August 1913, it was the first time that two black boxers had fought for the world heavyweight title. Battling Jim was the only black fighter Johnson faced during his reign as heavyweight champ from 1908 to 1915.

Title Shot
Battling Jim fought former colored champ Joe Jeanette four times between 19 July 1912 and 21 January 1912 and lost all four fights. The only fighter of note he did beat in that period was future colored champ Big Bill Tate, whom he K.O.-ed in the second round of a scheduled 10-round bout. It was Tate's third pro fight.

In November 1913, the International Boxing Union had declared the world heavyweight title held by Jack Johnson to be vacant. The heavyweight title fight between the two Johnsons, scheduled for 10 rounds, was held on 19 December 1913 in Paris. It was the first time in history that two blacks had fought for the world heavyweight championship.

Johnson v. Johnson
While the Johnson v. Johnson fight had been billed as a world heavyweight title match, in many ways, it resembled an exhibition. A sportswriter from the Indianapolis Star reported that the fight crowd became unruly when it was apparent that neither boxer was putting up a fight.

"Jack Johnson, the heavyweight champion, and Battling Jim Johnson, another colored pugilist, of Galveston, Texas, met in a 10-round contest here tonight, which ended in a draw. The spectators loudly protested throughout that the men were not fighting, and demanded their money back. Many of them left the hall. The organizers of the fight explained the fiasco by asserting that Jack Johnson's left arm was broken in the third round. There is no confirmation of a report that Jack Johnson had been stabbed and no evidence at the ringside of such an accident. During the first three rounds he was obviously playing with his opponent. After that it was observed that he was only using his right hand. When the fight was over he complained that his arm had been injured. Doctors who made an examination, certified to a slight fracture of the radius of the left arm. The general opinion is that his arm was injured in a wrestling match early in the week, and that a blow tonight caused the fracture of the bone."

Because of the draw, Jack Johnson kept his championship. After the fight, he explained that his left arm was injured in the third round and he could not use it.

Later career
Battling Jim's next fight, four months later, also was a title match. On 27 March 1914 in New York City, Sam Langford won a newspaper decision in a ten-rounder with Johnson. According to the New York Times, the colored heavyweight champ "won by a wide margin" because Johnson "failed to show anything remotely resembling championship ability."

Battling Jim fought Langford ten more times (including two more colored title matches). Two of the fights were draws, including their last fight on 22 September 1918, which was also Battling Jim's last pro bout.  He faced Joe Jeanette five more times and did not win a single contest. Two of their fights were draws and their last fight on 20 August 1918, Battling Jim's penultimate pro fight, was a no decision.
 
Of the other colored heavyweight champs that Battling Jim battled, he won only one fight, against Harry Wills, because he broke his wrist blocking a punch in a non-title match and Johnson won by a technical knockout. Battling Jim lost his other two fights with Wills and lost the five fights he had with ex-colored heavyweight champ Sam McVey in the post-Jack Johnson title shot period.

Illness and death
Jim was signed to fight Sam Langford in a 12-round fight at the Crescent Athletic Club in Lowell, Massachusetts. However, the fight was postponed due to the 1918 Spanish influenza pandemic. While waiting for the bout to be rescheduled, Johnson contracted the disease. After he was removed from the hospital, he died after a few days of pneumonia.

Record and legacy
Battling Jim ended with a career record of 30 wins against 31 losses and six draws  when his newspaper decisions are factored in. Looking at his dismal performance with the top black heavyweights of his era and his inability to best a one-armed Jack Johnson, Battling Jim Johnson cannot be considered a top contender of his era or a worthy opponent when Jack Johnson awarded him the sole title shot given to a black boxer in the 29 years between Jack and Joe Louis winning the heavyweight crown.

Professional boxing record
All information in this section is derived from BoxRec, unless otherwise stated.

Official record

All newspaper decisions are officially regarded as “no decision” bouts and are not counted in the win/loss/draw column.

Unofficial record

Record with the inclusion of newspaper decisions in the win/loss/draw column.

References

External links
 

1887 births
1918 deaths
African-American boxers
Sportspeople from East Orange, New Jersey
Heavyweight boxers
American male boxers
Boxers from New Jersey
Deaths from Spanish flu
20th-century African-American people